Michael L. Nash is a media executive and the Executive Vice President of Digital Strategy at Universal Music Group.

Career history
Labeled a “visionary” by The Atlantic Monthly,  Nash has been a part of the media technology and innovation front for much of his career, including, between 1994 and 1997, as founder and CEO of Inscape, an interactive entertainment and games publishing joint venture with WMG and HBO that won numerous product awards. In 1996, Entertainment Weekly named him one of multimedia's ten most influential forward-thinking figures.  Before that, Nash served as Director of the Criterion Collection, working closely with directors and artists such as Robert Altman, David Bowie, Terry Gilliam, Louis Malle, Nicolas Roeg and John Singleton.  Prior to joining WMG, Nash was Executive Director of the Madison Project, a music industry-first digital distribution trial.

Warner Music Group
In 2006, Nash oversaw Warner Music Group’s partnership with YouTube that led WMG to become the first global media company to embrace monetization of user-generated content.  The partnership also established WMG’s model to derive revenue from WMG music videos, which included WMG’s partnership with online video service, Hulu.  In 2008, WMG's Atlantic Records was cited by The New York Times as the first major label to report more than half of its U.S. recorded music revenue came from digital products.

Nash was responsible for WMG’s renegotiation with YouTube in 2009 that led to the creation of the WMG premium video platform and solidified WMG’s artist-first approach to online video content, including its embrace of social media.  In 2010, Nash helped secure WMG’s advertising alliance with MTV Networks.

Universal Music Group
Nash joined Universal Music Group as EVP of Digital Strategy and was named to the Executive Management Board in 2015.

Industry honors and achievements
Michael Nash made Billboard’s Power 100 list at #60 in 2015, when UMG’s streaming royalties accounted for over half of the company’s digital revenue. He also appeared on Billboard’s Digital Power Playlist in 2016.

References

American music industry executives
Living people
 Universal Music Group
Year of birth missing (living people)
Place of birth missing (living people)

External links
Michael Nash at Universal Music Group